Garfield Medical Center is a 210-bed general medical and surgical hospital in Monterey Park, California. In the most recent year with available data, the hospital had 11,586 admissions, 21,621 emergency department visits, 1,949 annual inpatient surgeries and 2,602 outpatient surgeries.  Garfield Medical Center is accredited by the Joint Commission (JC). The hospital first opened in 1921.

Garfield Medical Center has annual revenues of about $1.2 billion, and with 970 employees, the hospital is the second largest employer in Monterey Park.

References

External links
 Garfield Medical Center
 This hospital in the CA Healthcare Atlas A project by OSHPD

Monterey Park, California
Hospital buildings completed in 1921
Hospitals in Los Angeles County, California
Hospitals established in 1927